The United Gold Coast Convention (UGCC) was a political party founded in 1947 whose aim was to bring about Ghanaian independence from their British colonial masters after the Second World War. The United Gold Coast Convention appointed its leaders to include Kwame Nkrumah, who was the Secretary General. However, upon an allegation for plans against Nkrumah's leadership, he was arrested and jailed. The UGCC leadership broke up and Kwame Nkrumah went on a separate way to set up the Convention People's Party (CPP) for the purpose of self-governance. 
The UGCC was founded in Saltpond.

History
In the 1940s, African merchants, such as George Alfred Grant ("Paa Grant"), were ready to finance the organization of a political movement to assure their commercial interests in the face of unfair colonial practices. The party was founded by J. B. Danquah on 4 August 1947 by a combination of chiefs, academics and lawyers, including R. A. Awoonor-Williams, Robert Samuel Blay, Edward Akufo-Addo, and Emmanuel Obetsebi-Lamptey.

On 10 December 1947, Kwame Nkrumah returned to the Gold Coast, accepting Danquah's invitation to become the UGCC General Secretary. Big Six member Ebenezer Ako-Adjei recommended inviting Nkrumah, whom he had met at Lincoln University. Nkrumah was offered a salary of £250, and Paa Grant paid the boat fare from Liverpool in England to the Gold Coast. Danquah and Nkrumah subsequently disagreed over the direction of the independence movement and parted ways after two years. Nkrumah went on to form the Convention People's Party (CPP) in 1949 and eventually became the first president of independent Ghana. There was a meeting between Nkrumah and members of the party which occurred in Saltpond, a town in Central region. It was said Nkrumah rejected a proposal for the promotion of fundamental human rights.

The UGCC performed poorly in the 1951 elections, winning only three seats.  The following year, it merged with the National Democratic Party and disaffected members of the CPP, to form the Ghana Congress Party.

See also
Gold Coast (British colony)
The Big Six (Ghana)

References

History of Ghana
Defunct political parties in Ghana
1947 establishments in Gold Coast (British colony)
Political parties established in 1947
Political parties disestablished in 1952